An airport city is the “inside the fence” airport area of a large airport, including the airport (terminals, apron, and runways) and ""on-airport businesses"" such as air cargo, logistics, offices, retail, and hotels. The airport city is at the core of the Aerotropolis, a new urban form evolving around many major airports. The concepts of airport cities and Aerotropolises are promoted in the works of John D. Kasarda, a professor and a CEO of a consulting company associated with these concepts.

General description

The airport city model is based on the idea that an airport can target non-aeronautical services such as offices, hotels, convention centers, and entertainment to generate new sources of income. Airports are now routinely targeting non-aeronautical revenue streams amounting to 40–60% of their total revenues. Industry leaders and researchers share best practices on non-aeronautical revenues for airports at conferences and in literature, including refereed literature.

Since airports are typically surrounded by undeveloped land that acts as an environmental buffer for nearby residents, the land holdings can also present a real estate opportunity.

The airport city concept consists of a number of elements that reinforce each other. Services and facilities are designed to guide travellers through the airport transit process. Design of an airport city includes consideration of passengers, cargo, businesses, workers, and residents.

In 2011, Time named the airport city as one of “10 ideas that will change the world”.

Drivers 
Kasarda identified the following drivers to the development of airport cities:
 The creation of non-aeronautical revenue sources as well as serving traditional aviation functions.
 The commercial sector's pursuit of affordable, accessible land.
 Increased gateway passengers and cargo traffic generated by airports.
 Airports serving as a catalyst and magnet for land side business development.

The most common air side and land side airport city commercial activities include duty-free shops and airline lounges; restaurants, catering, and other food services; specialty retail and factory outlet centers; cultural and entertainment attractions; hotels; banks and currency exchanges; business offices and complexes; convention and exhibition centers; leisure, recreation and fitness venues; logistics and distribution; perishables and cold storage; and free trade zones and customs-free zones.

Some notable activities 
Airport cities may be found at major airports worldwide, particularly in Europe, and some older airports are being redeveloped or expanded on large tracts of unused airport land. Some new airports in Asia are also being planned as airport cities. North America, South America, and Africa all have airport city and Aerotropolis developments.

A qualitative list of airport city characteristics has been developed by researchers at the Center for Air Commerce at the Frank Hawkins Kenan Institute of Private Enterprise at the University of North Carolina at Chapel Hill.

Criteria include:

 Assessment by Kasarda and his colleague Dr. Stephen Appold.
 Demonstrated commitment to the Aerotropolis or airport city model as seen in the establishment of Aerotropolis steering committees, strategic planning, and development initiatives.
 Government/regulatory support of the Aerotropolis or airport city through Aerotropolis legislation, tax incentives or other mechanisms.
 Media announcements by proponents with substantiated evidence that an Aerotropolis or airport city initiative is moving forward.

The list is available at the Center for Air Commerce website and at Aerotropolis.com.

Gallery

References

External links

 Global Airport Cities
 https://archive.today/20130202111127/http://www.schipholgroup.com/B2B/SchipholRealEstate./AboutSchipholRealEstate.htm
 https://web.archive.org/web/20090505155242/http://www.airportcitybelgrade.com/main.php?content=whatis&language=en
 http://www.duesseldorf-international.de/dus/airport_city/
 https://web.archive.org/web/20100201045628/http://www.gateway-gardens.de/en/vision/airport_city.html
 Schiphol Group – AirportCity Concept

Aviation infrastructure